The Museum of Literature Ireland, branded MoLI in an homage to Molly Bloom, is a literary museum in Dublin, Ireland. It opened in September 2019. The museum is a partnership between the National Library of Ireland and University College Dublin (UCD). It is located in UCD's Newman House in St Stephen's Green. It holds a permanent collection of James Joyce-related material, including his "Copy No. 1" of Ulysses, and revolving exhibitions on other Irish literary figures. With a range of audio and immersive displays, it has been nominated for and won a number of awards for design and architecture.

History
The idea of a literary centre at Newman House began with a discussion between Eamonn Ceannt, Bursar / Vice-President for Finance and Regulation of University College Dublin, and a representative of the National Library of Ireland, at Bewley's Café.  The library no longer had a major display of its James Joyce materials, and the museum was originally conceived as an exposition of the work of Joyce, to be called Ulysses House.  Joyce himself had studied at both Newman House and the National Library.  The charitable foundation of Martin Naughton and his wife funded an initial study, and after discussion with Failte Ireland, which offered to join funding to the tune of 2.5 million euro, the concept was expanded to take in Irish literature in general. The Naughtons added further significant funding, amounting to nearly half the total, and UCD raised 2.5 million euro of additional funds. In formulating a name for the expanded project, a Joycean link was deemed important, so a name was devised, the acronym of which would relate to his work - hence MoLI (pronounced "Molly") in homage to Molly Bloom.

The academic lead was UCD's Professor of Anglo-Irish Literature, Margaret Kelleher. The museum architectural project began in 2012, and design was worked on from 2014, based on a conversion of the Newman House complex, the original home of University College Dublin, on St Stephen's Green. The design was developed by Ralph Appelbaum Associates, and the architectural work is by Scott Tallon Walker. Emphasis was placed on auditory material and potential for visitor interaction.

A major part of the work was the development of a museum-grade central stairway, a lift and modern fire escape provisions. The overall project cost over 11 million euro.

The museum's first director is Simon O'Connor, who previously worked as part of the founding team of The Little Museum of Dublin.

Originally planned to open in the spring of 2019, MoLI was launched with an evening opening on Culture Night, 20 September 2019, attended by the Director of the National Library and the President of UCD, with general opening from the following day, 10:30 am to 6 pm daily, with late opening on Thursdays. Admission is paid.

Experience and holdings
Newman House is a complex of two Georgian houses and the original university Aula Maxima (Great Hall), and all of this space, with some new "insertions", is used for the museum.  MoLI is laid out over three floors, each with a theme.  The ground floor is themed place and contains immersive displays, the first voice and the second inspiration, which includes an area for visitors to produce their own work.

MoLI is able to draw on the collections of the National Library, and the Special Collections of UCD Library.  Two central elements of the exhibitions are Joyce's "Copy No. 1" of Ulysses, which he inscribed to a patron, Harriet Weaver, and which she donated to the National Library of Ireland in 1952, and the Riverrun of Language, named from the first word of Joyce's Finnegans Wake, which responds to visitor movements with "showers of sound" from work in both English and Irish over more than a thousand years.  The earliest piece is by a female author of around 900 A.D., the latest from the present day.  Other work on display includes Joyce manuscript pages, some annotated, a letter from Joyce to William Butler Yeats and samples of Joyce's notebooks in a second-floor display aimed at inspiring visitors to create their own work.

Exhibitions
The first of MoLI's revolving exhibitions, in place for the opening, was on Kate O'Brien, and this was followed by one on Nuala O'Faolain.  Also in place for the launch was a section on Young Adult Fiction, including general fiction, science fiction and fantasy.

Education
The museum planned from before opening for both a specialist research library and outreach programmes for adults and school children.

Garden and ancillary facilities
Ancillary public facilities are on the lower ground floor, while offices are on a closed third floor.
The museum's Readers Garden, which is also accessible from the Iveagh Gardens public park, contains a courtyard aspect of the café, places to read, and a sculpture of a reading Jesuit. Operation of the museum café, The Commons, on the lower ground floor, and planned to have direct access from the street and Iveagh Gardens, is contracted to Peaches and Domini Kemp. The museum shop is in the interior of the lower floor.

Governance and operations
The museum premises are owned by UCD, and it is a collaboration between the university and the National Library of Ireland. It is operated by a UCD company, Newman House Literary Centre, CLG, which has a board of up to 7 members, all unpaid: up to 4 delegates of UCD, 2 of the National Library, and an independent chair (appointed by UCD).

The museum is headed by a director, supported by a Head of Operations, a Head of Learning and Culture, and a Digital Curator. Other staff include leads for visitor experience, retail, events and facilities.

Recognition
The design received an Honourable Mention from Creative Review magazine. The museum won an Industrial Designers Society of America Gold Award in the Environments category in 2020. It also won a MUSE Design Award for Interior Design in 2020, and a Good Design (Environments) Award from The European Centre for Architecture, Art, Design and Urban Studies. The adaptation work on the building was a shortlisted nominee for the Public Choice Award of the Royal Institute of the Architects of Ireland 2020.

Media
The design, building and launch of the museum were presented in a documentary, Making a Museum: The Story of MoLI, by Luke McManus, broadcast on RTÉ Television on Bloomsday 2020.

The museum has had a digital radio station, RadioMoLI, from before its opening, and a dedicated broadcasting room was planned. For its reopening after COVID-19 pandemic closure, it produced a short film, primarily of its garden, based around a reading of a short piece from Time and the Gods by the Anglo-Irish writer Lord Dunsany.

See also
 James Joyce Centre
 James Joyce Tower and Museum

References

External links

Time-lapse video of the construction of the museum
The museum's YouTube channel, with Videos about bursaries and awards

Museums in Dublin (city)
Literary museums in Ireland
History museums in the Republic of Ireland
2019 establishments in Ireland
Museums established in 2019
James Joyce
Ulysses (novel)